Johann Prokop von Schaffgotsch or Johann Prokop Graf von Schaffgotsch Freiherr von Kynast und Greiffenstein; Czech: Jan Prokop Schaaffgotsche (22 May 1748, Prague – 8 May 1813, Budweis) was a Roman Catholic clergyman and bishop. He was an auxiliary bishop in Prague and the first bishop of České Budějovice.

Sources
http://www.catholic-hierarchy.org/bishop/bschjp.html

References

1748 births
1813 deaths
Bishops of České Budějovice
Clergy from Prague
19th-century Roman Catholic bishops in Austria-Hungary